The eighth season of the television series Lud, Zbunjen, Normalan aired between May 15, 2015 and November 2, 2015 on Nova TV and TV Prva. The season contained 24 episodes.

Cast

Episodes

References

External links

Lud, zbunjen, normalan
2015 Bosnia and Herzegovina television seasons